Keith Baxter may refer to:

Keith Baxter (actor) (born 1933), Welsh actor and director
Keith Baxter (drummer) (1971–2008), British musician